The Men's 10 kilometre sprint biathlon competition at the 1992 Winter Olympics was held on 12 February, at Les Saisies. Competitors raced over three loops of the skiing course, shooting two times, once prone and once standing. Each miss was penalized by requiring the competitor to race over a 150-metre penalty loop.

Results

References

Men's biathlon at the 1992 Winter Olympics